Adrian Ionuț Voicu (born 11 August 1992) is a Romanian professional footballer who plays as a forward for Concordia Chiajna.

Honours
FC Voluntari
Liga II:  2014–15
Liga III: 2013–14
Romanian Supercup: 2017

Turris Turnu Măgurele
Liga III: 2018–19

FC U Craiova 1948
Liga II: 2020–21

References

External links
 
 
 

1992 births
Living people
Footballers from Bucharest
Romanian footballers
Association football forwards
Liga I players
Liga II players
FC Voluntari players
FC Olimpia Satu Mare players
ASC Daco-Getica București players
AFC Turris-Oltul Turnu Măgurele players
FC U Craiova 1948 players
CS Concordia Chiajna players